The  is an archaeological  site with a cluster of burial mounds from the Kofun period located in what is now part of the city of Kakegawa, Shizuoka in the Tōkai region of Japan. The site was designated a National Historic Site of Japan in 1996.

Overview
The Wadaoka Kofun group is located in an area measuring approximately 2.5 kilometers north-south by one kilometer east-west, on a low plateau overlooking the Haranoya River west of the downtown area of modern Kakegawa city. The site  consists of four keyhole-shaped kofun, 15 circular-shaped kofun, and four square-shaped kofun, all dating from the 5th century to the sixth century AD.   The largest include:

These tumuli are believed to be the tombs of local kings who ruled the Haranodani River basin. The Wakanezuka Kofun is considered the oldest, but its pit-type burial chamber was robbed in 1974 before a proper archaeological excavation could be made. Many of the tumuli were once covered in fukiishi and had haniwa clay figurines, and the Yoshioka-Otsuka Kofun has traces of a moat remaining. Grave goods recovered from the tombs included, large numbers of iron weapons, fragments of armor, pottery shards and shinju-kyo bronze mirrors. 

The necropolis is located approximately 15 minutes on foot from the Tenryu Hamanako Line's Hosoya Station. There are plans to make an archaeological park in the area.

See also
List of Historic Sites of Japan (Shizuoka)

References

External links
Kakegawa home page 

Kofun
History of Shizuoka Prefecture
Kakegawa, Shizuoka
Historic Sites of Japan